Finnen may refer to:

 Finnen (Eggerberg), a settlement in the municipality of Eggerberg in the Swiss canton of Valais
 Patricio Miguel Finnen, an Argentine intelligence operative